The British Rail Class 08 is a class of diesel-electric shunting locomotives built by British Railways (BR). As the standard BR general-purpose diesel shunter, the class became a familiar sight at major stations and freight yards. Since their introduction in 1952, however, the nature of rail traffic in Britain has changed considerably. Freight trains are now mostly fixed rakes of wagons, and passenger trains are mostly multiple units or have Driving Van Trailers, neither requiring the attention of a shunting locomotive. Consequently, a large proportion of the class has been withdrawn from mainline use and stored, scrapped, exported or sold to industrial or heritage railways.

As of 2020, around 100 locomotives remained working on industrial sidings and on the main British network. On heritage railways, they have become common, appearing on many of the preserved standard-gauge lines in Britain, with over 70 preserved, including the first one built.

History

The Class 08 design was based on the LMS 12033 series (later TOPS Class 11) design. There were also 26 of the near-identical but higher-geared Class 09, and 171 similar locomotives fitted with different engines and transmissions (some of which became Class 10), which together brought the total number of outwardly-similar machines to 1,193.

The pioneer locomotive, number 13000, was built in 1952 although it did not enter service until 1953. Production continued until 1962 with 996 locomotives produced, making it the most numerous of any British shunting locomotive class, and indeed, the most numerous of any British locomotive class overall.

The locomotives were built at the BR's Crewe, Darlington, Derby, Doncaster and Horwich works.

In 1985, three locomotives were reduced in height for use on the Burry Port and Gwendraeth Valley Railway in southwest Wales, and became Class 08/9. The remainder of the class were reclassified as sub-class 08/0. A further two were converted to 08/9s in 1987.

The first locomotive to be withdrawn was D3193 in 1967. Four other 08s were withdrawn before TOPS reclassification in 1973. Withdrawals continued in subsequent decades until by the beginning of the 1990s most of the class had been withdrawn. As part of the privatisation of British Rail in the mid-1990s most of the survivors passed to EWS with some going to passenger operators for use as depot shunters. At the same time as the withdrawals, many were purchased by heritage railways.

In mid-2008, EWS had over 40 class 08s in operation, with a greater number stored. Freightliner also had about five in operation, as did the locomotive company Wabtec. FirstGroup operated fewer than five; additionally, some work at industrial sidings – two for Foster Yeoman, one for Mendip Rail, one for Corus, one at ICI Wilton, two for English China Clays, amongst others. A few other businesses in the rail industry operated single examples.

Exported locomotives
Sixteen English Electric 0-6-0DE 350 hp locomotives, based on the Class 11/Class 08 design but modified for 1,600 mm (5 ft 3 in) gauge, were built new and exported 1951–53 to Australia, entering service on the Victorian Railways as the F class.

Five Class 08s were exported to Liberia, numbers 3047, 3092, 3094, 3098 and 3100. All five locos remain in Liberia and have been considerably robbed of parts in the intervening years.

In 2007, 08 738 and 08 939 were equipped for multiple operation at Toton TMD and repainted in Euro Cargo Rail livery before being sent to France in April 2009.

Operations

As the standard general-purpose diesel shunter on BR, almost any duty requiring shunting would involve a Class 08; thus the many locations where two portions of a train were merged, or where additional stock was added to a train, were hauled (briefly) by a Class 08, thus the class was a familiar sight at many major stations and terminals.

Technical description
The Class 08 design was based on the LMS 12033 series (later TOPS Class 11) design.

The engine is an English Electric (EE) 6 cylinder, 4-stroke, 6KT. Traction motors are two EE 506 motors with double reduction gear drive. The main generator is an EE 801.

Design variations 
There were variations on the basic design, which were given the following TOPS design codes:

Class 08/9 
 
Class 08/9 locomotives were modified from the standard class by being given headlights and cut-down bodywork in which the overall height was reduced to 11’ 10" (3.61 m), for use on the Burry Port and Gwendraeth Valley Railway up to Cwm Mawr. In 2007, three were used on infrastructure trains on the Manchester Metrolink.

BR Class 13

Six Class 08 units were adapted for a specialist role at Tinsley Marshalling Yard, where there was a requirement for more powerful shunters. These locomotives were permanently coupled together in pairs as a 'master and slave' (the slave unit with its cab removed) and reclassified as Class 13. All were withdrawn by 1985.

Fleet

Preservation

Continuing in its designed-for role as a shunter, the Class 08 has been found useful by numerous heritage railways in the UK. With over 70 examples preserved, they are the second most numerous class of preserved locomotive in the UK.

Models 

Several manufacturers have produced models of Class 08 shunters. In OO scale, Wrenn, Tri-ang, Hornby Railways and Bachmann Branchline all produced models. Lima also produced a model in several different liveries, but it was of the near-identical Class 09.

Since 2000, both Bachmann Branchline and Hornby have released much more detailed models, in a variety of liveries and with a variety of appropriate detail variations.

In British N Gauge, Graham Farish produced a relatively crude all-metal version, made in England, lacking outside frames and with a too-wide bonnet that was discontinued in 2007.  A more detailed version with outside frames and a scale-width diecast bonnet was unveiled 2008 under the brand Graham Farish by Bachmann following the sale of the company.

Notes and references

Further reading

External links

 Restoration work on Class 08 – 08220

08
English Electric locomotives
C locomotives
Railway locomotives introduced in 1953
Standard gauge locomotives of Great Britain
Diesel-electric locomotives of Great Britain
Diesel-electric locomotives of Liberia
Shunting locomotives